WACM (1270 AM) is a radio station licensed to serve Springfield, Massachusetts, United States.  The station is owned by John Fuller, through licensee Red Wolf Broadcasting Corporation. It airs an oldies music format, simulcasting WSKP 1180 AM Hope Valley, Rhode Island. Throughout the 1960s and 1970s, the station had a Top 40 format. Later decades, the station had a talk/news approach before its current format.

The station was assigned the WSPR call letters by the Federal Communications Commission in 1936. On April 12, 2016, it changed its call sign to the current WACM.

On May 1, 2016 WACM changed their format from Spanish tropical (as "Bomba 1270") to oldies, branded as "Kool Radio AM" (simulcasting WSKP 1180 AM Hope Valley, Rhode Island).

WACM’s programming is also simulcasted on W261DD, a translator station broadcasting on 100.1 FM.

Translator

References

External links

ACM (AM)
Oldies radio stations in the United States
Radio stations established in 1936
Mass media in Springfield, Massachusetts
1936 establishments in Massachusetts